Marhaura Assembly constituency is an assembly constituency in Saran district in the Indian state of Bihar.

Overview
As per Delimitation of Parliamentary and Assembly constituencies Order, 2008, No. 117 Marhaura Assembly constituency is composed of the following: Marhaura and Nagra  community development blocks.

Marhaura Assembly constituency is part of No. 20 Saran (Lok Sabha constituency). It was earlier part of Chapra (Lok Sabha constituency).

Members of Legislative Assembly

Election results

2020

References

External links
 

Assembly constituencies of Bihar
Politics of Saran district